This is a timeline of the Tang dynasty, which covers a period of roughly 289 years, from 618, when the dynasty was founded, to 907, when the last Tang emperor was deposed by the warlord Zhu Wen, who established the Later Liang dynasty, inaugurating the period of Five Dynasties and Ten Kingdoms. Information on areas and events relevant to the Tang dynasty such as the Wu interregnum, when Wu Zetian established her own Zhou dynasty, and other realms such as the Sui dynasty, Tibetan Empire, Three Kingdoms of Korea, Nanzhao, Japan and steppe nomads are also included where necessary.

7th Century

610s

620s

630s

640s

650s

660s

670s

680s

690s

8th Century

700s

710s

720s

730s

740s

750s

760s

770s

780s

790s

9th Century

800s

810s

820s

830s

840s

850s

860s

870s

880s

890s

10th Century

Gallery

See also
Administrative divisions of the Tang dynasty

Citations

References

 .

 (alk. paper)

  (paperback).
 

 
 .

 

 

 
 

 
 
  
 

Tang dynasty
Years in China
Tang